Ovays Azizi (born 29 January 1992) is an Afghan footballer.  He is a  goalkeeper for Danish 1st Division club Hillerød and the Afghanistan national team.

International career
Azizi made his debut for the Afghanistan national football team in a 2–0 friendly loss to Thailand on 3 September 2015.

Personal life
Azizi was born in Afghanistan and lost his father and grandparents in the Afghan Civil War. His mother and his 4 siblings took refuge in Iran. In 2001, he was accepted as a refugee in Denmark. Azizi also worked in occupational therapy in Denmark.

References

External links
 
 Ovays Azizi at Lagstatistik.se

1992 births
Living people
Sportspeople from Herat
Afghan men's footballers
Afghanistan international footballers
Afghan emigrants to Denmark
Afghan expatriates in Iran
Association football goalkeepers
BK Avarta players
IF Skjold Birkerød players
Maziya S&RC players
Allerød FK players
FC Rosengård 1917 players
Afghan expatriate footballers
Afghan expatriate sportspeople in Denmark
Afghan expatriate sportspeople in Sweden
Expatriate men's footballers in Denmark
Expatriate footballers in the Maldives
Expatriate footballers in Sweden